Leandro da Silva Wanderley (born 19 April 1979), simply known as Leandro, is a Brazilian footballer who plays for Associação Desportiva Cabofriense as a left back.

Football career
Born in Rio de Janeiro, Leandro made his professional debuts at the age of 18, with hometown's América Football Club. Two years later he joined Esporte Clube Vitória and, in 2002, moved to Cruzeiro Esporte Clube. In the latter club, he was an undisputed starter in the 2003 season, as the team won both the league and cup trophies.

In January 2005, Leandro moved to Europe and signed with Portugal's F.C. Porto. He made his league debut on the 15th in a 0–0 away draw against Académica de Coimbra but, failing to adjust, he returned to his country on loan shortly after, spending two years with former team Cruzeiro.

Deemed surplus to requirements at Porto, Leandro continued in the same predicament in the following years, always in his country. On 4 October 2008, in a match against Clube Atlético Mineiro, he completed 100 official games for Sociedade Esportiva Palmeiras, being honored with a No. 100 jersey; subsequently he represented Fluminense Football Club, Vitória and Atlético Mineiro.

On 4 September 2012, Palmeiras confirmed that Leandro signed a four-month contract. Only two months later, however, he was released.

Honours
Vitória
Nordeste Cup: 1999
Bahia State League: 2000
Bahia State Superleague: 2002

Cruzeiro
Minas Gerais State League: 2003, 2004, 2006
Brazilian Cup: 2003
Brazilian League: 2003

Palmeiras
São Paulo State League: 2008

References

External links

CBF data  
Globo Esporte profile 

1979 births
Living people
Brazilian people of Dutch descent
Brazilian footballers
Association football defenders
Campeonato Brasileiro Série A players
America Football Club (RJ) players
Esporte Clube Vitória players
Cruzeiro Esporte Clube players
Sociedade Esportiva Palmeiras players
Fluminense FC players
Clube Atlético Mineiro players
Associação Desportiva Cabofriense players
Primeira Liga players
FC Porto players
Brazilian expatriate footballers
Expatriate footballers in Portugal
Brazilian expatriate sportspeople in Portugal
Footballers from Rio de Janeiro (city)